Avântul Reghin is a Romanian professional football club from Reghin, Mureș County, Romania, founded in 1949.

It currently plays in the Liga III, Seria IX.

History

The club was founded in summer 1949 and soon played in the Romanian first league, Liga I, finishing 13th (last) in 1955. Since then, it has played only in Liga II and Liga III.

In 2008, the team finished second in the third league and participated at the play-offs for the promotion to Liga II. It made a good impression but failed to qualify. Same in 2016.

Honours
Liga I
Best Finish 13th 1955
Liga II
Winners (1): 1954
Liga III
Winners (3): 1976–77, 1982–83, 1987–88
Runners-up (6): 1986–87, 1989–90, 1990–91, 1991–92, 2007–08, 2015–16

Liga IV – Mureș County
Winners (2): 1972–73, 1998–99

Players

First team squad

Out on loan

Club officials

Board of directors

Current technical staff

League history

Managers
  Cristian Dulca

References

External links

Association football clubs established in 1949
Football clubs in Mureș County
Liga I clubs
Liga II clubs
Liga III clubs
1949 establishments in Romania
Reghin